Winchester Bay is an unincorporated community in Douglas County, Oregon, United States. For statistical purposes, the United States Census Bureau has defined Winchester Bay as a census-designated place (CDP). The census definition of the area may not precisely correspond to local understanding of the area with the same name. The population of the CDP was 382 at the 2010 census. The community of Umpqua City was established in 1850.

Geography and climate

Demographics

2000 Census data
As of the census of 2000, there were 488 people, 238 households, and 139 families residing in the CDP. The population density was 183.6 people per square mile (70.8/km2). There were 362 housing units at an average density of 136.2 per square mile (52.5/km2). The racial makeup of the CDP was 96.11% White, 1.43% Native American, 0.41% Asian, 0.20% from other races, and 1.84% from two or more races. Hispanic or Latino of any race were 1.43% of the population. There were 238 households, out of which 16.8% had children under the age of 18 living with them, 50.8% were married couples living together, 4.2% had a female householder with no husband present, and 41.2% were non-families. 36.6% of all households were made up of individuals, and 20.2% had someone living alone who was 65 years of age or older. The average household size was 2.01 and the average family size was 2.57.

In the CDP, the population was 16.8% under the age of 18, 7.6% from 18 to 24, 18.9% from 25 to 44, 27.5% from 45 to 64, and 29.3% who were 65 years of age or older. The median age was 50 years. For every 100 females, there were 116.9 males. For every 100 females age 18 and over, there were 120.7 males. The median income for a household in the CDP was $30,139, and the median income for a family was $37,292. Males had a median income of $30,625 versus $22,321 for females. The per capita income for the CDP was $17,307. About 17.9% of families and 21.3% of the population were below the poverty line, including 38.1% of those under age 18 and 6.3% of those age 65 or over.

Economy

The local Winchester Bay Merchant Association promotes economic development in the community. Tourism is a significant component of the economy with recreational vehicle use on the nearby sand dunes, tours of the Umpqua River Lighthouse, and crabbing in the bay as the primary attractions. Winchester Bay, formerly referred to as Whistling Basin by the small Native American population, has seen a marked increase in tourism despite being a sparsely populated outpost. The merchant association has dubbed the community as the "Crab Capital of the World." The largest annual activity is the annual Dune Fest, usually a five-day event. In recent years, Siuslaw National Forest enforcement of alcohol consumption and under-age drinking was enacted to improve safety for participants. Medical care is available at Lower Umpqua Hospital in nearby Reedsport.

References

External links

Census-designated places in Oregon
Oregon Coast
Bays of Oregon
Unincorporated communities in Douglas County, Oregon
Census-designated places in Douglas County, Oregon
1850 establishments in Oregon Territory
Unincorporated communities in Oregon
Populated coastal places in Oregon
Bodies of water of Douglas County, Oregon